Ann E. Carlson (born 1960) is an American attorney and legal scholar who has served as the acting administrator of the National Highway Traffic Safety Administration since September 2022. Before joining the Biden administration, Carlson was the Shirley Shapiro Professor of Environmental Law at the UCLA School of Law, where she also served as faculty co-director of the Emmett Center on Climate Change and the Environment. She is an expert on U.S. environmental law and policy with a particular focus on climate change and environmental federalism.

Education 

Carlson earned a Bachelor of Arts degree in political science from the University of California, Santa Barbara in 1982 and a Juris Doctor from Harvard Law School in 1989.

Career 

Carlson joined the faculty of UCLA in 1994. She previously practiced law with the Los Angeles public interest law firm Hall and Phillips (now Phillips and Cohen), where she represented Stephanie Nordlinger in a challenge to California's Proposition 13 in a case that reached the Supreme Court of the United States. Her work representing Emil Stache and Almon Muelhausen in a case under the False Claims Act against Teledyne Industries was featured in the book The Giantkillers.

At UCLA, Carlson has served as Academic Associate Dean and currently serves as Vice Dean for Faculty Recruitment and Intellectual Life. Carlson's scholarship examines unusual arrangements of federalism, evaluation of domestic environmental law and policy, and climate change. Carlson is the recipient of UCLA's highest teaching honor, the Eby Award for the Art of Teaching, and the Rutter Award for Excellence in Teaching.

Carlson served as a panelist for the influential National Academy of Sciences committee on Limiting the Magnitude of Climate Change. She is a member of the Steering Committee of the American Academy of Arts and Sciences Alternative Energy Future project. Carlson is a frequent commentator on environmental issues and a founder of and frequent blogger at Legal Planet.

National Highway Traffic Safety Administration (NHTSA) 
On January 21, 2021, the Department of Transportation announced Carlson as the incoming chief counsel to the National Highway Traffic Safety Administration (NHTSA) in the Biden administration. In September 2022, Carlson became acting administrator of NHTSA, and on February 13, 2023, President Joe Biden nominated her to a term as administrator of the agency.

During her tenure, the NHTSA has accelerate its probe into Tesla's Autopilot technology to ensure that drivers are paying adequate attention to the road.

Works
 (Roger W. Findley, Daniel A. Farber and Jody Freeman)

References 

1960 births
Living people
University of California, Santa Barbara alumni
UCLA School of Law faculty
Harvard Law School alumni
California lawyers
American women lawyers
American women legal scholars
American legal scholars
American women academics
21st-century American women